The 1903 Villanova Wildcats football team represented the Villanova University during the 1903 college football season. The team's captain was Martin Caine.

Schedule

References

Villanova
Villanova Wildcats football seasons
Villanova Wildcats football